The following is a list of Oricon number-one albums of 2018. Oricon supplies statistics and information on music and the music industry in Japan.

Chart history

See also
List of Oricon number-one singles of 2018

References

Number-one albums
Japan Oricon Albums
2018